Really Really Happy is the fifth album by the American pop punk band The Muffs, released in August 2004. The vinyl and CD releases have different cover art.

A remastered 2-disc Deluxe version, with including four bonus tracks and a 16-track set of demos, was released on May 13, 2022.

Track listing

Contents of the Deluxe Edition bonus disc were previously released separately on vinyl only for Record Store Day in April 2022.

Personnel
The band's musical credits are described in the album's liner notes:
 Kim Shattuck – Guitar, vocals, harmonica
 Ronnie Barnett – Bass
 Roy McDonald – Drums, percussion

Ronnie Barnett is given additional credit for toy piano, and session musician Brian Kehew plays organ on "My Lucky Day". Background vocals are credited to Kevin Sutherland and Greg Saunders on "Don't Pick On Me", and to Kristen Shattuck on "My Lucky Day" and "Oh Poor You".

All tracks were produced and engineered by Kim Shattuck.

References

External links
 
 

The Muffs albums
2004 albums